Isabelle Peretz  (born 1956) is a professor of psychology at the University of Montreal, holding a Canada Research Chair and Casavant Chair in neurocognition of music. She specializes in music cognition, focusing on congenital and acquired musical disorders (amusia) and on the cognitive and biological foundations of music processing in general.

Education
Peretz was educated in Brussels, Belgium, and she earned her Ph.D. in experimental psychology at the Université libre de Bruxelles in 1984, after which she accepted a faculty position at the University of Montreal.

Career
In 2005, Peretz became the founding co-director of the international laboratory for Brain, Music, and Sound research (BRAMS), a multi-university consortium that is jointly affiliated with McGill University and the Université de Montréal. She is also a chief editor of the journal section Frontiers in Auditory Cognitive Neuroscience.

Peretz was elected a fellow of the Royal Society of Canada in 2008. In 2018, she was appointed an Officer of the Order of Quebec. The following year, she was the appointed a Member of the Order of Canada.

Selected works

References

External links
Isabelle Peretz's Homepage
Peretz Music and Cognition Lab
BRAMS Website

1956 births
Living people
Canadian women psychologists
Canadian cognitive neuroscientists
Canadian women neuroscientists
Academic staff of the Université de Montréal
Canada Research Chairs
Members of the Order of Canada
Fellows of the Royal Society of Canada